is a passenger railway station located in the city of Zama, Kanagawa Prefecture, Japan, operated by the East Japan Railway Company (JR East).

Lines

Station layout
The station consists of a single side platform and an unmanned station building.

History
Iriya Station was opened on February 23, 1935, as a station on the Sagami Railway. On June 1, 1944, the Sagami Railway was nationalized and merged with the Japan National Railways. Freight services were discontinued from February 1961. On April 1, 1987, with the dissolution and privatization of the Japan National Railways, the station came under the operation of JR East. Automated turnstiles using the Suica IC card system came into operation from November 2001.

Passenger statistics
In fiscal 2007, the station was used by an average of 1,091 passengers daily (boarding passengers only).

Surrounding area
The area including the station site is designated as an urbanization control area. Land use for other than agricultural land is severely restricted. Rice fields spread around the area, and even the house closest to the station is located at a distance of 100 meters or more. 
Kanagawa Prefectural Zama High School
Kanagawa Prefectural Zama School for the Disabled

See also
List of railway stations in Japan

External links

JR East HP for Iriya Station

Railway stations in Japan opened in 1935
Railway stations in Kanagawa Prefecture
Sagami Line
Zama, Kanagawa